Sphinx perelegans, the elegant sphinx, is a species of hawkmoth.

Distribution 
It is native to western North America from British Columbia to Baja California and to New Mexico.

Description 
The wingspan is 98–110 mm.

Biology 
There is one generation per year in the north with adults on wing in June and July. In California, there is one generation (although there might be a partial second) with adults on wing from April to June and again from August to September.

The adult of this species is a key pollinator of the rare lemon lily (Lilium parryi) in California.

The larvae feed on Arctostaphylos manzanita, Arbutus menziesii, Cercocarpus betuloides and Prunus ilicifolia. In captivity, they will feed on Gaultheria shallon.

References

External links

Elegant Sphinx Moths of America
Life cycle

Sphinx (genus)
Moths of North America
Moths of Central America
Fauna of the California chaparral and woodlands
Moths described in 1874